Holding the Void is the self-titled album by Joseph Arthur's side project of the same name. Holding the Void was recorded in late 2002 and released in early 2003 in limited quantities on Joseph's website and at his live shows. The album is described on Joseph's website as "pure rock 'n' roll." Holding the Void features Joseph on vocals and guitar, Pat Sansone (of Wilco and The Autumn Defense) on bass and backing vocals, and Rene Lopez (solo musician; frequent collaborator with Joseph Arthur) on drums and backing vocals.

Track listing

Notes
 Songs by Joseph Arthur, arranged by Holding the Void.
 Recorded by Tom Schick.
 Mixed by Tom Schick and Holding the Void.
 Mastered by Fred Kevorkian.
 Artwork by Joseph Arthur.

External links
 Holding the Void's official MySpace page
 Holding the Void lyrics/details on lonelyastronauts.com

References

Joseph Arthur albums
2003 albums